Sebastian Gärtner (born 3 February 1993) is a German footballer who plays as a midfielder.

References

External links
 Profile at DFB.de
 Profile at kicker.de

1993 births
Living people
Footballers from Nuremberg
German footballers
Germany youth international footballers
Association football midfielders
1. FC Nürnberg II players
1. FC Nürnberg players
1. FSV Mainz 05 II players
SV Waldhof Mannheim players
3. Liga players
Regionalliga players